JFSC may refer to:

 Jersey Financial Services Commission
 Joint Forces Staff College in Norfolk, Virginia